Anna Maria Garthwaite (b. Harston, Leicestershire, c. 14 March 1688 – October 1763) was an English textile designer known for creating vivid floral designs for silk fabrics hand-woven in Spitalfields, London, in the mid-18th century.  Garthwaite was acknowledged as one of the premiere English designers of her day.  Many of her original designs in watercolours have survived, and silks based on these designs have been identified in portraiture and in costume collections in England and abroad.

Life and work
Anna Maria Garthwaite was the daughter of the Reverend Ephraim Garthwaite (1647–1719) of Grantham, Lincolnshire, who was rector of nearby Harston, Leicestershire, at the time of her birth, and his wife Rejoyce Hausted. Anna Maria left Grantham to live in York with her twice-widowed sister Mary from 1726 to 1728 They relocated to a house in Princes Street (now Princelet Street) in the silk-weaving district of Spitalfields east of the City of London in 1728, and Anna Maria created over 1000 designs for woven silks there over the next three decades. Some 874 of her original designs in watercolour from the 1720s through 1756 have survived and are now in the collection of the Victoria and Albert Museum. Many of these designs are dated and annotated with weaving instructions and the names of the weavers to whom they were sold. A waistcoat woven to one of Garthwaite's designs in the collection of the Costume Institute of the Metropolitan Museum of Art.

Garthwaite's work is closely associated with the mid-18th century fashion for flowered woven silks in the Roccoco style, with its new emphasis on asymmetrical structures and sinuous C- and S-curves. She adapted the points rentrés technique developed by the French silk designer Jean Revel in the 1730s for representing near-three-dimensional floral patterns through careful shading, and designed large-scale damasks as well as floral brocades. From 1742–43, Garthwaite's work—and English silk design in general—diverged from French styles, favouring clusters of smaller naturalistic flowers in bright colours scattered across a (usually) pale ground.  The taste for vividly realistic florals reflects the advances in botanical illustration in Britain at this time, and can be contrasted with French silks of the period which show stylised flowers and more harmonious, if unrealistic, colourations.  

Spitalfields silks were widely exported to Northern Europe and especially to Colonial America, which was prohibited from trading directly with France by Britain's Navigation Acts. The connections established in Colonial America allowed Garthwaite's silk to be spread and recognized around the globe. Surviving silk skirt panels said to have been owned by Martha Dandridge prior to her marriage to George Washington have been attributed to Garthwaite, because the panels, which are housed in the Colonial Williamsburg collection, match one of her extant watercolor designs.

Her will dated 1758 was read 24 October 1763, at Princes Street in the parish of Christ Church. She was buried at Christ Church three days later on 27 October 1763 as Anna-Maria Garthwaite aged 75 of Princes Street.

Assessment and legacy

Garthwaite has been called the "pre-eminent silk designer of her period". Malachy Postlethwayt (c. 1707–1767) in The Universal Dictionary of Trade and Commerce of 1751 listed Garthwaite as one of three designers who had "introduced the Principles of Painting into the loom."

A Blue Plaque granted by English Heritage in 1998 marks the house at 2 Princelet Street, Spitalfields, E1, where Garthwaite lived and worked.

See also
History of silk

References

Citations

Bibliography
Anishanslin, Zara: Portrait of a Woman in Silk: Hidden Histories of the British Atlantic World, Yale University Press, 2016.  (focusing on the portrait by Robert Feke of Mrs Charles Willing in a dress made of silk designed by Garthwaite)
Baumgarten, Linda: What Clothes Reveal: The Language of Clothing in Colonial and Federal America, Yale University Press, 2002. 
Browne, Claire: Silk Designs of the Eighteenth Century: From the Victoria and Albert Museum, London, Thames & Hudson, 1996, 
Ginsburg, M.  ‘Garthwaite, Anna Maria (1688–1763?)’Oxford Dictionary of National Biography, Oxford University Press, 2004,  (subscription required for online access)
Freshman, Philip, Dorothy J. Schuler, and Barbara Einzig, eds.: An Elegant Art: Fashion & Fantasy in the Eighteenth Century, Abrams/Los Angeles County Museum of Art, 1983, 
Jenkins, David, ed.: The Cambridge History of Western Textiles, Cambridge, UK: Cambridge University Press, 2003, 
Rothstein, Natalie: The Victoria and Albert Museum's Textile Collection: Woven Textile Design in Britain to 1750, Canopy Books, New York, London, and Paris, 1994. 
Rothstein, Natalie: The Victoria and Albert Museum's Textile Collection: Woven Textile Design in Britain 1750 to 1850, Canopy Books, New York, London, and Paris, 1994.

Further reading
Rothstein, Natalie: Silk Designs of the Eighteenth Century: In the Collection of the Victoria and Albert Museum, London, With a Complete Catalogue, Bullfinch Press, 1990,

External links

Silk brocade designed by Anna Maria Garthwaite, 1748, at the Metropolitan Museum of Art
Surviving sleeved waistcoat, 1747, patterned silk designed by Anna Maria Garthwaite
Surviving dress of silk designed by Anna Maria Garthwaite, at the Albany Institute of History and Art
Surviving 18th century English slks, several designed by Anna Maria Garthwaite, in the Abegg Foundation collection in Switzerland
Textile Production in Europe: Silk, 1600–1800 (contextual essay at the Metropolitan Museum of Art Timeline of Art History)

1688 births
1763 deaths
People from the Borough of Melton
British textile designers
English designers